The following lists the top 25 singles of 2020 in Australia from the Australian Recording Industry Association (ARIA) end-of-year singles chart.

"Blinding Lights" by The Weeknd  was the top selling single of 2020 in Australia, spending eleven weeks at No. 1 and being certified six times platinum. "Dance Monkey" by Tones and I, which was the previous year's highest-selling Australian song, held that title for the second consecutive year, being certified thirteen times platinum and spending a further 3 weeks atop the chart, for an overall total of 24 weeks.

See also  
 List of number-one singles of 2020 (Australia) 
 List of top 10 singles in 2020 (Australia) 
 List of Top 25 albums for 2020 in Australia 
 2020 in music 
 ARIA Charts 
 List of Australian chart achievements and milestones

References 

Australian record charts
2020 in Australian music
Australia Top 25 Singles